The 2006 Finnish Cup was the 52nd season of the main annual association football cup competition in Finland. It was organised as a single-elimination knock–out tournament and participation in the competition was voluntary.  A total of 386 teams registered for the competition.

Teams

Round 1

Round 2

Round 3

Round 4

Round 5

Round 6

Round 7

Quarter-finals

Semi-finals

Final

Details

References

External links
 Results from RSSSF
 Suomen Cup Official site 

Finnish Cup seasons
Finnish Cup, 2006
Finnish Cup, 2006